Springfield Union Station may refer to:

Springfield Union Station (Massachusetts), a train and bus station in the Metro Center area
Springfield Union Station (Illinois), a historic train station, housing the Abraham Lincoln Presidential Library and Museum

See also
Union Station (disambiguation)
Springfield railway station, serving the village of Springfield in Fife, Scotland
Springfield station (Illinois), a current Amtrak station in Springfield, Illinois